Kendang or Gendang (Tausug/Bajau/Maranao: Gandang, Bugis: Gendrang and Makassar: Gandrang or Ganrang ) is a two-headed drum used by people from the Indonesian Archipelago.
Kendang is one of the primary instruments used in the Gamelan ensembles of Javanese, Sundanese, and Balinese, the Kendang ensemble as well as various Kulintang ensembles in Indonesia, Brunei, Malaysia, Singapore, and the Philippines. It is constructed in a variety of ways by different ethnic groups. It is a relation to the Indian mridangam double-headed drum.

Overview
The typical double-sided membrane drums are known throughout Maritime Southeast Asia and India. One of the oldest image of kendang can be found in ancient temples in Indonesia, especially the ninth century Borobudur and Prambanan temple.

Among the Javanese, Sundanese, and Balinese, the  has one side larger than the other, with the larger, lower-pitched side usually placed to the right, and are usually placed on stands horizontally and hit with the hands on either side while seated on the floor. Amongst groups like the Balinese, Tausug, and Maranao, both sides are of equal size, and are played on either one or both sides using a combination of hands and/or sticks.

The  usually has the function of keeping the tempo (laya) while changing the density, and signaling some of the transitions to sections and the end of the piece.

In the dance or  performance, the  player will follow the movements of the dancer, and communicate them to the other players in the ensemble. In another composition called Rampak Kendang, a group of drummers play in harmony.

Among the Makassarese, the  drums have much more importance, with it considered the most sacred of all musical instruments, comparable to gongs in Java. They are usually played alone with multiple drums playing different patterns creating syncopation.

Kendang making 
Good kendang instruments are said to be made from the wood of jackfruit, coconuts or cempedak. Buffalo hide is often used for the bam (inferior surface which emits low-pitch beats) while soft goatskin is used for the chang (superior surface which emits high-pitch beats).

The skin is stretched on y-shaped leather or rattan strings, which can be tightened to change the pitch of the heads. The thinner the leather the sharper the sound.

Accompaniments

Javanese
In Gamelan Reog, kendhang are used To accompany the Reog Ponorogo art, the sound produced by Kendhang Reog is very distinctive with the beat of "dang thak dhak thung glhang". The existence of Kendang Reog is currently the largest in the world of the existing types of Kendhang.

In Gamelan Surakarta, four sizes of kendhang are used:
"single drum") style, which is used for the most solemn or majestic pieces or parts of pieces. "double drum") style, which is used in faster tempos and less solemn pieces.
  is also medium-sized, and was traditionally used to accompany  performances, although now other drums can be used as well.
It is typically used for livelier sections within a piece. The word ciblon derives from a Javanese type of water-play, where people smack the water with different hand shapes to give different sounds and complex rhythms. The technique of this , which is said to imitate the water-play, is more difficult to learn than the other kendang styles.

Sundanese
In Sundanese Gamelan, a minimum set consists of three drums.
  (large drum)
 , two (small drum). Kendang Kulanter is divided into two, namely the Katipung and the Kutiplak.
Many types of Sundanese Kendang are distinguished according to their function in accompaniment :
 Kendang Kiliningan
 Kendang Jaipongan
 Kendang Ketuk Tilu
 Kendang Keurseus
 Kendang Penca
 Kendang Bajidor
 Kendang Sisingaan and others.
Each type of drums in Sundanese music has a difference in size, pattern, variety, and motif.

Balinese
In , there are two :
 , the "female" and lowest pitched.
 , the "male" and highest pitched.

Makassarese
 (Makassarese s) can be divided to three types:
  is the largest drums as a result it is also called  (largest drum in Makassarese language).These drums are usually used in important sacred ceremonies such as blessing for sultanate's heirlooms.
  are usually smaller with diameters measuring in 30–40 cm, which are usually used for  dance, which used 2-4 drums with differing beats and symbolizes the men's strength and vitality.
  are usually the smallest with diameters measuring in 20–25 cm, and used as martial arts accompaniments.

Buginese
There are generally three types of beats pattern in  playing:
  patterns are usually the beginning as intro
  are played afterwards which are usually more energetic
  patterns are used afterward, as finale.

Gallery

See also 

 Dabakan
 Gendang beleq
 Gordang sambilan
 Rampak Kendang

Sources

Further reading
 Sumarsam. Javanese Gamelan Instruments and Vocalists. 1978–1979.

External links 

 Kendang information, with audio
 Rampak Kendang in Google.

Gamelan instruments
Drums
Hand drums
Bruneian musical instruments
Indonesian musical instruments
Malaysian musical instruments
Philippine musical instruments
Philippine folk instruments